Sama Foulala is a village and rural commune in the Cercle of Ségou in the Ségou Region of southern-central Mali. The commune contains 7 villages in an area of approximately 154 square kilometers. In the 2009 census it had a population of 6,180. The village of Sama Foulala, is on the left (north) bank of the River Niger.

References

External links
.
.

Communes of Ségou Region